Steven, Stephen or Steve Gadd may refer to:

Steve Gadd (born 1945), American session drummer
Stephen Gadd (born 1964), English operatic baritone
Steve Gadd (born 1952), vocalist of the band Stray
Steve Gadd, drummer for the UK band Charlie